Agriphila argentistrigellus is a species of moth in the family Crambidae. It is found in France, Spain and on Sicily, as well as in North Africa, including Morocco, Libya and Algeria.

The wingspan is about 25 mm.

Subspecies
Agriphila argentistrigellus argentistrigella
Agriphila argentistrigellus osseella (Hampson, 1900) (Spain)

References

Moths described in 1888
Crambini
Moths of Europe
Moths of Africa